Gigantea is a genus of land planarians from the Neotropical realm.

Description 
Species of Gigantea have a large, broad and flat body. The copulatory apparatus has a permanent penis and the ovovitelline ducts enter the female atrium from below. This definition, however, is incomplete regarding the anatomical features currently considered in the definition of planarian genera and Gigantea is certainly a heterogeneous genus.

Etymology 
The name Gigantea (Latin for "giant") comes from the specific epithet, gigantea, of the type-species, originally described as Geoplana gigantea due to its large size.

Species 
Currently, there are 13 species assigned to the genus Gigantea:

Gigantea bistriata (Hyman, 1962)
Gigantea cameliae (Furhmann, 1912)
Gigantea chiriquii (Hyman, 1962)
Gigantea gigantea (von Graff, 1899)
Gigantea gouvernoni Jones & Sterrer, 2005
Gigantea idaia (Du Bois-Reymond Marcus, 1951)
Gigantea maupoi Carbayo, 2008
Gigantea montana (Hyman, 1939)
Gigantea picadoi (de Beauchamp, 1912)
Gigantea sandersoni (Prudhoe, 1949)
Gigantea unicolor (Hyman, 1955)
Gigantea urubambensis Negrete, Brusa & Carbayo, 2010
Gigantea vongunteni (Fuhrmann, 1912)

References 

Geoplanidae
Rhabditophora genera